Schieren railway station is a railway station serving Schieren, in central Luxembourg.  It is operated by Chemins de Fer Luxembourgeois, the state-owned railway company.

The station is situated on Line 10, which connects Luxembourg City to the centre and north of the country.

External links
 Official CFL page on Schieren station
 Rail.lu page on Schieren station

Diekirch (canton)
Railway stations in Luxembourg
Railway stations on CFL Line 10